The Malankara Orthodox Syrian Church (MOSC) also known as the Indian Orthodox Church (IOC) or simply as the Malankara Church, is an autocephalous Oriental Orthodox church headquartered in Devalokam, near Kottayam, India. The church serves India's Saint Thomas Christian (also known as Nasrani) population. According to tradition, these communities originated in the missions of Thomas the Apostle in the 1st century (circa 52 AD).  It employs the Malankara Rite, an Indian form of the West Syriac liturgical rite.

The MOSC descends from the Malankara Church and its affiliation with the Syriac Orthodox Church. However, between 1909 and 1912, a schism over the authority of the Syriac Orthodox Patriarch of Antioch's authority resulted in the dissolution of the unified Malankara Church and establishment of the overlapping and conflicting MOSC and Jacobite Syrian Christian Church (JSCC). Since 1912, the MOSC has maintained a catholicate, the Catholicos of the East and Malankara Metropolitan–presently Baselios Marthoma Mathews III–who is the primate of the church. The MOSC drafted and formally adopted a constitution in 1934, wherein the church formally declared the Malankara Metropolitan and the Catholicos of the East as one. The Malankara Orthodox Syrian Church asserts communion with the other Oriental Orthodox churches. However, regular legal and occasional physical confrontations between the MOSC and the Syriac Orthodox JSCC have continued despite multiple efforts to reconcile the churches.

The Malankara Orthodox Syrian Church accepts miaphysitism, which holds that in the one person of Jesus Christ, divinity and humanity are united in one (μία, mia) nature (φύσις – "physis") without separation, without confusion, without alteration and without mixing where Christ is consubstantial with God the Father. Around 500 bishops within the Patriarchates of Alexandria, Antioch and Jerusalem refused to accept the dyophysitism (two natures) doctrine decreed by the 4th ecumenical council, the Council of Chalcedon in 451, an incident that resulted in the first major split in the main body of the Christian Church. While the Oriental Orthodox churches rejected the Chalcedonian definition, the sees that would later become the Catholic Church and the Eastern Orthodox Church accepted this council.

Self-reporting roughly 2.5 million members (with external estimates of roughly 1 million) across 30 dioceses worldwide, a significant proportion of the Malankara Orthodox Syrian Church's adherents reside in the southern India state of Kerala with the diaspora communities in North America, Europe, the Middle East, Malaysia, Singapore, Australia and New Zealand.

History

Early history

According to tradition, Christianity first arrived in India with Thomas the Apostle during the 1st century AD, evolving into Saint Thomas Christianity over several centuries. While isolated and generally independent in administration, Indian Christians maintained contact  with the Christian hierarchies of Antioch, Persia, and potentially Alexandria. The Saint Thomas Christians had relationships with the Persian Church of the East from at least the 6th century onward. The Indians inherited its East Syriac dialect for liturgical use and gradually became Syriac Christians in ritual and doctrine. They received clerical support from Persian bishops, who traveled to Kerala in merchant ships on the spice route. For much of this period, Saint Thomas Christians were under the leadership of an archdeacon (a native ecclesiastical head with temporal powers, deriving from the Greek arkhidiākonos).

During the 16th century, efforts by the Portuguese Padroado–an arm of the Catholic Church–to bring the Saint Thomas Christians under the administration of the Latin Church and attempts to Latinize the Malankara Rite led to the first of several rifts in the community. These divisions intensified following the 1599 Synod of Diamper. Saint Thomas Christians who were opposed to the Portuguese Padroado missionaries took the Coonan Cross Oath on 3 January 1653. The Dutch East India Company expulsion of the Portuguese from much of Malabar enabled the reconciliation of some Saint Thomas Christians and the Catholic Church, with this group eventually evolving into the Syro-Malabar Catholic Church, an Eastern Catholic church that adopted the Chaldean Catholic Church's East Syriac Rite and Diophysite christology.

Malankara Church

Many Saint Thomas Christian chose to remain independent from the Catholic Church. Patriarch Gregorios Abdal Jaleel, the Syriac Orthodox Archbishop of Jerusalem, witnessed the 1665 ordination of Thomas as Bishop Thoma I, who forged a renewed relationship with the Syriac Orthodox Church of Antioch and Saint Thomas Christians, which laid the foundation for adopting West Syrian liturgy and practices over the next two centuries. Those who supported the indigenous church leader of Malankara, Thoma I, and adopted West Syrian liturgies and practices and Miaphysite faith evolved into the Malankara Church.

19th century
The Arthat Padiyola declared that the administration of Malankara Church was independent and the bishops from Rome, Antioch, and Babylon had no role in the Malankara Church hierarchy, despite continued efforts to integrate the remaining independent Saint Thomas Christians into these patriarchates. In 1807, four gospels of Holy Bible in Syriac were translated to Malayalam by Kayamkulam Philipose Ramban. The Malankara Orthodox Theological Seminary in Kottayam was established in 1815 under the leadership of Pulikottil Ittup Ramban (Mar Dionysius II). The Mavelikara Synod (Padiyola) led by Cheppad Mar Dionysius rejected the suggestions put forward by Anglican missioneries and Reformation group and declared the beliefs and theology of Malankara Church were same as the Syriac Orthodox Church of Antioch.

20th century
Geevarghese Dionysius of Vattasseril, who became the Malankara metropolitan bishop in 1908, played a significant role with the other clerical and lay leaders of Malankara in re-establishing the Catholicos of the East in India in 1912. In 1909 the relations with the Syrian Orthodox Church soured, when Patriarch Ignatius Abded Aloho II who arrived in India, began demanding registered deeds granting the patriarch temporal authority over the church. Dionysius rejected the request and thus emerged two factions in the church. The faction that supported the Patriarch came to be called as "Bava Kakshi" (Patriarch Faction) and the faction that supported the Malankara Metropolitan came to be known as "Methran Kakshi" (Metropolitan Faction).  The Malankara Orthodox Syrian Church wanted to retain its autocephaly, and appealed to Syriac Orthodox Patriarch of Antioch Ignatius Abdul Masih II. He enthroned Murimattathil Paulose Ivanios as Baselios Paulose I, Catholicos of the East, on the apostolic throne of St. Thomas at St. Mary's Church in Niranam on 15 September 1912.

In 1934, The Malankara Church adopted a constitution for smooth functioning of the church, parishes and institution. In 1947, Saint Gregorios of Parumala was declared as a saint by the Church. In 1952 the Official Residence of the Malankara Metropolitan and the Headquarters of Malankara Church was shifted to Devalokam from Pazhaya Seminary. In 1958, The Supreme Court declared Catholicos Baselios Geevarghese II as the legitimate Malankara Metropolitan. The two factions of the Malankara Orthodox Church rejoined. In 1964, Syriac Orthodox Patriarch of Antioch participated in the enthronement ceremony of the Catholicos and Malankara Metropolitan, Baselios Augen I. In 1995, the Supreme Court of India declared the MOSC constitution adopted in 1934 was valid.

21st century 
In 2002, fresh elections were conducted in Malankara Association under the observation of Supreme Court of India. The Supreme Court declared Catholicos Baselios Marthoma Mathews II is the official and legitimate Malankara Metropolitan and also declared that this decision cannot be disputed in any platform. In 2003, Vattasheril Dionysius VI was declared as a saint. In 2012, the centennial of the establishment of the church and Catholicate were celebrated with history classes and church publications. On 3 July 2017, a major verdict by the Supreme Court of India declared the MOSC legally applicable to all parishes in disputed possession between the MOSC and Jacobite Syrian Christian Church.

Hierarchy, presence and doctrine

The spiritual head of the church is the Catholicos of the East, and its temporal head is the Malankara Metropolitan. Since 1934, both titles have been vested in one person; the official title of the head of the church is "The Catholicos of the Apostolic Throne of Saint Thomas and The Malankara Metropolitan". Baselios Marthoma Paulose II was enthroned as the Malankara Metropolitan and the Catholicos of the Malankara Church on 1 November 2010 at St. Peter and St. Paul's Church, Parumala. He is  the eighth Catholicose of the East in Malankara and the 21st Malankara Metropolitan.

Oriental Orthodox Churches, including the Malankara Orthodox Syrian Church, accept only the first three ecumenical councils: the First Council of Nicaea, the First Council of Constantinople, and the Council of Ephesus. The church, like all other Oriental Orthodox Churches, uses the original Nicene Creed without the filioque clause. Like the Syriac Orthodox Church, it primarily uses the liturgy of Saint James in Malayalam, Konkani, Kannada, Hindi, English and other Indian languages.

Liturgy and canonical hours

The church has used the Malankara Rite, part of the Antiochene Rite, since the 17th century. The Jacobite Church and the Maronite Church also belong to the same liturgical family. In the first half of the fifth century, the Antiochene church adopted the Liturgy of Saint James. In the 4th and 5th centuries, The liturgical language of fourth- and fifth-century Jerusalem and Antioch was Greek, and the original liturgy was composed in Greek.

After the Council of Chalcedon in 451, the Eastern Church was divided in two; one group accepted the council, and the other opposed it. Both groups continued to use the Greek version of the Saint James liturgy. The Byzantine emperor Justin (518–527) expelled the opponents from Antioch, and they took refuge in the Syriac-speaking Mesopotamia on the Roman–Persian border (modern eastern Syria, Iraq, and southeastern Turkey). The Antiochene liturgical rites were gradually translated into Syriac, and Syriac hymns were introduced.

Gregorios Abdal Jaleel came to Malankara from Jerusalem in 1665 and introduced Syriac Orthodox liturgical rites. The most striking characteristic of the Antiochene liturgy is its large number of anaphoras (celebrations of the Eucharist). About eighty are known, and about a dozen are used in India. All have been composed following the Liturgy of Saint James.

Christians of the Malankara Orthodox Syrian Church pray the canonical hours of the Shehimo at fixed prayer times seven times a day.

Saints

In conformity with other Eastern and Oriental Orthodox Churches, and also with the Catholic Church, the Malankara church adheres to the tradition of seeking the intercession of saints. Several have been canonized: 
 Geevarghese Gregorios of Parumala: Entombed in St. Peter and St. Paul's Church, Parumala, and canonized by Geevarghese II in 1947
 Baselios Yeldo: Entombed in St. Thomas Church, Kothamangalam, and canonised by Geevarghese II in 1947
 Geevarghese Dionysius of Vattasseril: Entombed in the Orthodox Theological Seminary, Kottayam, and canonized by Mathews II in 2003
 Antonio Francisco Xavier Alvares: Entombed in St. Mary's Orthodox Church, Ribandar, and declared a regional saint by Paulose II in 2015. (Not officially canonized a saint)
 Fr. Roque Zephrin Noronah: Entombed in St. Mary's Orthodox Cathedral, Brahmavar, and declared a regional saint by Paulose II in 2015 (Not officially canonized a saint)

Malankara Metropolitan
The temporal, ecclesiastical and spiritual administration of the church is vested in the Malankara Metropolitan, subject to the church constitution which was adopted in 1934. The Malankara Metropolitan is president of the Malankara Syrian Christian Association (Malankara Association) and its managing committee, and trustee of community properties. He is the custodian of the Pazhaya Seminary and other common properties of Malankara Syrian Community. He is also the custodian of vattipanam interest which was deposited in Travancore Government by Marthoma VII. He is elected by the Malankara association.

List of Malankara Metropolitan of the Malankara Orthodox Syrian Church
Thoma I (1653–1670)
Thoma II (1670–1686)
Thoma III (1686–1688)
Thoma IV (1688–1728)
Thoma V (1728–1765)
Thoma VI (1765–1808)
Thoma VII (1808–1809)
Thoma VIII (1809–1816)
Thoma IX (1816)
Dionysius II (1816)
Dionysius III (1817–1825)
Dionysius IV (1825–1852)
Mathews Athanasius (1852–1877)
Dionysius V (1865–1909)
Dionysius VI (1909–1934)
Geevarghese II (1934–1964) From 1934 Malankara Metropolitan also holds the office of Catholicos of the East of the Malankara Orthodox Syrian Church.
Augen I (1964–1975), also Catholicos of the East
Mathews I (1975–1991), also Catholicos of the East
Mathews II (1991–2005), also Catholicos of the East
Didymos I (2005–2010), also Catholicos of the East
Paulose II (2010–2021), also Catholicos of the East
Mathews III (15th Oct 2021–Present), also Catholicos of the East

Catholicate
"Catholicos" means "the general head", and can be considered equivalent to "universal bishop." The early church had three priestly ranks: episcopos (bishop), priest and deacon. By the end of the third century, bishops of important cities in the Roman Empire became known as metropolitans. The fourth-century ecumenical councils recognized the authority of the metropolitan. By the fifth century, the bishops of Rome, Constantinople, Alexandria and Antioch gained control of the churches in surrounding cities.They gradually became the heads of the regional churches, and were known as patriarchs (common father). Outside the Roman Empire, patriarchs were known as catholicos. There were four catholicates before the fifth century: the Catholicate of the East, the Catholicate of Armenia, the Catholicate of Georgia and the Catholicate of Albania. In Orthodox tradition, any apostolic and autonomous national church (often referred to as a local church) may call its head a catholicos, pope or patriarch. The archdeacons reigned from the fourth to the 16th centuries; in 1653, the archdeacon was elevated to bishop by the community as Mar Thoma I.

The Catholicate of the East was relocated to India in 1912, and Baselios Paulose I was seated on the apostolic throne of St. Thomas as the Catholicos of the East. The headquarters of the Malankara Orthodox Syrian Church and the Catholicos of the East is the Catholicate Palace at Devalokam, Kottayam, Kerala, which was consecrated on 31 December 1951. The new palace, built in 1961, was dedicated by visiting Armenian Catholicos Vazgen IThe Holy Synod and Managing committee designated H.G.Dr. Mathews Mor Severios to the new Malankara Metropolitan and Catholicos of Malankara Church succeeding Baselios Marthoma Paulose II. He was consecrated as the 22nd Malankara Metropolitan during the Malankara Association that took place on the 14th of October 2021 at St. Peter and St. Paul's Church, Parumala and enthroned as the 9th Catholicos of Malankara Church on 15 October 2021.[8][9][10].
Relics of St. Thomas are kept in the catholicate chapel, and Geevarghese II, Augen I, Mathews I and Paulose II are interred there.

List of Catholicos of the East of the Malankara Orthodox Syrian Church 
The list of Catholicos of the East of Malankara Church:
Baselios Paulose I (1912–1914)
 Vacant (1914–1925)
Baselios Geevarghese I (1925–1928)
Baselios Geevarghese II (1929–1964)
 From 1934 Catholicos is also holding the office of Malankara Metropolitan.
Baselios Augen I (1964–1975)
Baselios Mar Thoma Mathews I (1975–1991)
Baselios Mar Thoma Mathews II (1991–2005)
Baselios Mar Thoma Didymos I (2005–2010)
Baselios Mar Thoma Paulose II (2010–2021)
Baselios Mar Thoma Mathews III  (2021–present)

Administration
Until the 17th century, the church was administered by the archdeacon (Malankara Moopan). The elected archdeacon was in charge of day-to-day affairs, including the ordination of deacons to the priesthood. Ordinations were performed by Persian bishops visiting India. The Malankara Palliyogam (a forerunner of the Malankara Association) consisted of elected representatives from individual parishes. The isolation of the Malankara church from the rest of Christendom preserved the apostolic age's democratic nature through interactions with Portuguese (Roman Catholic) and British (Anglican) colonialists. From the 17th to the 20th centuries, the church had five pillars of administration:
 The Episcopal Synod, presided over by the Catholicos of the East
 The Malankara Association, presided by Malankara Metropolitan
 Three trustees: the Malankara metropolitan and priest and lay trustees
 The Malankara Association's managing and working committees

1934 church constitution
Envisioned by Dionysius VI, the church's general and day-to-day administration was codified in its 1934 constitution. The constitution was presented at the 26 December 1934 Malankara Christian Association meeting at M. D. Seminary, adopted and enacted. It has been amended three times. Although the constitution was challenged in court by dissident supporters of the Patriarch of Antioch, Supreme Court rulings in 1958, 1995, 2017 and 2018 upheld its validity.

The constitution's first article emphasises the bond between the Syriac Orthodox Church and the Malankara church, defining that the Malankara Orthodox Syrian Church is a division of the Orthodox Syrian Church, whose chief Primate is the Syriac Orthodox Patriarch of Antioch. The Chief Primate of Malankara Church is Catholicos who is also the Malankara Metropolitan. The second article outlines the church's foundation and designates its primate as the Catholicos. The third article refers to the name of the church, and the fourth to their faith traditions. The fifth article examines the canon law governing church administration.

Malankara Association
The elected Malankara Association, consisting of parish members, manages the church's religious and social concerns. Formerly the Malankara Palli-yogam (മലങ്കര പള്ളി യോഗം; Malankara Parish Assembly, its modern form is believed to have been founded in 1873 as the Mulanthuruthy Synod, a gathering of parish representatives in Parumala. In 1876, the Malankara Association began.

The church constitution outlines the association's powers and responsibilities. The Catholicos of the East and Malankara Metropolitan is the president, and the diocesan metropolitan bishops are vice-presidents. All positions are elected. Each parish is represented in the association by an elected priest and laypeople, proportional to parish-membership size.

Dioceses

 Thiruvananthapuram Diocese
 Kollam Diocese
 Kottarakkara Punaloor Diocese
 Adoor Kadampanad Diocese
 Thumpamon Diocese
 Nilakal Diocese
 Mavelikara Diocese
 Chengannur Diocese
 Niranam Diocese
 Kottayam Diocese
 Kottayam Central Diocese
 Idukki Diocese
 Kandanad West Diocese
 Kandanad East Diocese
 Kochi Diocese
 Angamaly Diocese
 Thrissur Diocese
 Kunnamkulam Diocese
 Malabar Diocese
 Sulthan Bathery Diocese
 Brahmavar Diocese
 Bangalore Diocese
 Madras Diocese
 Bombay Diocese
 Ahmedabad Diocese
 Delhi Diocese
 Calcutta Diocese
 UK, Europe and Africa Diocese
 Northeast America Diocese
 Southwest America Diocese

Metropolitan Bishops
The church's Episcopal Synod has the following diocesan bishops:

 Baselios Marthoma Mathews III Catholicos of the East and Malankara Metropolitan.Kandanad West and Kottayam Central
 Thomas Mar Athanasios – Metropolitan of Kandanad East Diocese
 Yuhanon Mar Meletius – Metropolitan of Thrissur Diocese
 Kuriakose Clemis – Metropolitan of Thumbamon Diocese
 Zachariah Mar Anthonios – Retired
 Geevarghese Mar Coorilose – Metropolitan of Bombay Diocese
 Zachariah Mar Nicholovos – Metropolitan of Northeast America Diocese
 Yakob Mar Irenios – Metropolitan of Kochi Diocese
 Gabriel Mar Gregorios -Metropolitan of Trivandrum Diocese
 Yuhanon Mar Chrysostamos – Metropolitan of Niranam Diocese
 Yuhanon Mar Policarpos – Metropolitan of Ankamali Diocese
 Mathews Mar Theodosius - On Leave
 Joseph Mar Dionysius –  Metropolitan of Kollam Diocese
 Abraham Mar Ephiphanios – Metropolitan of Mavelikara Diocese
 Mathews Mar Thimothios – Metropolitan of Chengannur Diocese
 Alexios Mar Eusebios - Metropolitan of Calcutta Diocese
 Yuhanon Mar Dioscoros – Metropolitan of Kottayam Diocese 
 Youhanon Mar Demetrios – Metropolitan of Delhi Diocese 
 Yuhanon Mar Thevodoros – Metropolitan of Kottarakara–Punalur Diocese
 Yakob Mar Elias – Metropolitan of Brahmavar Diocese
 Joshua Mar Nicodemos – Metropolitan of Nilackal Diocese
 Zacharias Mar Aprem – Metropolitan of Adoor–Kadampanadu Diocese
 Geevarghese Mar Yulios – Metropolitan of Kunnamkulam Diocese
 Abraham Mar Seraphim – Metropolitan of Bangalore  Diocese
 Abraham Mar Stephanos-Metropolitan of UK, Europe, Africa Diocese
 Thomas Mar Ivanios- Metropolitan of Southwest America Diocese
 Geevarghese Mar Theophilos- Metropolitan of Ahmedabad Diocese
 Geevarghese Mar Philexinos- Metropolitan of Madras  Diocese
 Geevarghese Mar Pachomios- Metropolitan of Malabar Diocese
 Geevarghese Mar Barnabas- Metropolitan of Sulthan Bathery  Diocese
 Zachariah Mar Severios- Metropolitan of Idukki Diocese

Churches with historical importance

 St. Peter and St. Paul's Church, Parumala 
 St. George's Church, Chandanapally
 St. Mary's Orthodox Cathedral, Arthat
 St. Mary's Church, Thiruvithamcode, established by Apostle Saint Thomas
 St. Mary's Church, Niranam, established by Apostle Saint Thomas
 St. Mary’s Orthodox Cathedral, Puthencavu
 St. Mary's Orthodox Cathedral, Pazhanji
 St. Mary's Church, Kottayam 
 KalladaValiyapally
 KundaraValiyapally
 St. Thomas Orthodox Syrian Cathedral, Mulanthuruthy
 Thumpamon Valiya Pally
 Ambalam Pally, Kunnamkulam
 Thevalakkara Church
Kottakkakathu Old Syrian Church, Karthikappally
 Puthuppally Pally
 St. Mary's Orthodox Cathedral, Kandanad
 St. Thomas Orthodox Cathedral, Kadampanad
 St. Peter and St. Paul's Church, Kolenchery
 St. George Orthodox Church, Cheppad 
 St. Mary's Orthodox Syrian Cathedral, Piravom
 St. George's Church, Kadamattom
 St Mary's Orthodox Church, Kallooppara
 St. George's Church, Chandanapally
 St. Mary’s Orthodox Cathedral, Puthiyacavu Mavelikara
 Old Syrian Church, Chengannur
 St. Stephen's Orthodox Cathedral, Kudassanad
 Kadeesa Orthodox Cathedral, Kayamkulam

Monasteries and convents

Monastery of Saint Thomas, Vettikkal
Mount Tabor Monastery, Pathanapuram
The Bethany Ashram

Spiritual organizations
The church has a number of spiritual organizations:

Orthodox Syrian Sunday School Association of the East (OSSAE)
Orthodox Christian Youth Movement (OCYM)
Mar Gregorios Orthodox Christian Student Movement (MGOCSM)
Divyabodhanam (Theological Education Programme for the Laity)
St. Paul's & St.Thomas Suvishesha Sangam (National Association for Mission Studies) 
Orthodox Sabha Gayaka Sangham 
Malankara Orthodox Baskiyoma Association
Servants of the Cross
Akhila Malankara Prayer Group Association
Akhila Malankara Orthodox Shusrushaka Sangham (AMOSS)
Mission Board and Mission Society
Ministry of Human Empowerment
Akhila Malankara Balasamajam
St. Thomas Orthodox Vaidika Sanghom
Marth Mariam Vanitha Samajam (women's wing) 
Ecological Commission
Ardra Charitable Trust

Seminaries
The two seminaries which offers bachelor's and master's degrees in theology are Orthodox Theological Seminary, Kottayam and St. Thomas Orthodox Theological Seminary, Nagpur.
The Malankara Orthodox Seminary at Kottayam is the first Orthodox Seminary in Asia established in year 1815.

Ecumenical relations
The church was a founding member of the World Council of Churches. Catholicos Geevarghese II and other metropolitan participated in the 1937 Conference on Faith and Order in Edinburgh; a church delegation participated in the 1948 WCC meeting in Amsterdam in 1948, and the church played a role in the 1961 WCC conference in New Delhi. Metropolitan Paulos Gregorios was president of the WCC from 1983 to 1991.

The church participated in the 1965 Conference of Oriental Orthodox Churches in Addis Ababa. It is a member of the Faith and Order Commission, the Christian Conference of Asia
and the Global Christian Forum. A number of primates of sister churches have visited, including Patriarch Justinian of Romania in February 1957 and in January 1969; Catholicos of All Armenians Vazgen I in December 1963; Armenian Patriarch Derderian of Jerusalem in December 1972; Patriarch Pimen I of Moscow in January 1977; Catholicos-Patriarch of All Georgia Ilia II in September 1982; Archbishop of Canterbury Robert Runcie in 1986, Patriarch Teoctist Arăpașu of Romania in 1989; Ecumenical Patriarch of Constantinople Bartholomew I in November 2000; Metropolitan (later Patriarch) Kirill of the Russian Orthodox Church in December 2006; Catholicos of All Armenians Karekin II in November 2008, Patriarch of Ethiopia Abune Paulos in December 2008; the Armenian Catholicos of Cilicia Aram I Keshishian in February 2010, and Patriarch of Ethiopia Abune Mathias in November 2016.

Order of St. Thomas
The Order of St. Thomas, the church's highest award is presented to heads of state and churches by the Catholicos of the East and Malankara Metropolitan. Recipients include Bartholomew I of Constantinople, Patriarch and Catholicos of All Armenians Karekin II, Patriarch of Ethiopia Abune Paulos, Armenian Catholicos of Cilicia Aram I, and Patriarch of Ethiopia Abune Mathias.

See also

List of Malankara Metropolitans
List of metropolitans of the Indian Orthodox Church

References

Bibliography

 
 
 
 
 Joseph Cheeran, et al.(2002) Tradition and History of Indian Orthodox Church, p. 300–423
 Menachery, George (1973). The St. Thomas Christian Encyclopaedia of India Vol. II.
 Menachery, George (1998). The Indian Church History Classics: The Nazranies.
 
 
 
 Tamcke, Martin (2009). Die Christen vom tur Abdin: Hinführung zur Syrisch-orthodoxen Kirche. Verlag Otto Lembeck. 3874765806.
 
 Van der Ploeg, J. P. M. (1983). The Christians of St. Thomas in South India and their Syriac Manuscripts. Dharmaram Publications.

External links

 Official website of the Indian (Malankara) Orthodox Syrian Church
 Complete website of Catholicos of The East and Malankara Metropolitan
 Malankara Orthodox Syrian Church Constitution of 1934
 Indian Orthodox Radio | E – Radio from the Shores of Malankara to the World
 Indian Orthodox Herald: News about the Catholicate of the East
 Matha Mariam Media: A Complete Orthodox Web Portal maintained by Trivandrum Diocese
 ICON Indian Christian Orthodox Network – Catholicos of the East
 Malankara Orthodox TV

 
1912 establishments in British India
Oriental Orthodoxy in India
Saint Thomas Christians
Members of the National Council of Churches
Members of the World Council of Churches
Oriental Orthodox organizations established in the 20th century
Affiliated institutions of the National Council of Churches in India